The Holy Ground is a 1993 album by Mary Black. The album went platinum in Ireland on the day of its release and reached number one on the Irish albums chart.

Track listing
"Summer Sent You" (Noel Brazil) - 3:17
"Flesh and Blood" (Shane Howard) - 4:01
"The Loving Time" (Noel Brazil) - 4:26
"Golden Thread" (Thom Moore) - 4:10
"The Holy Ground" (Traditional; arranged by Mary Black and Jimmy Crowley) - 4:29
"Treasure Island" (John Gorka) - 3:12
"The Holy Ground" (Gerry O'Beirne) - 3:20
"One Way Donkey Ride" (Sandy Denny) - 3:26
"Dockland" (Noel Brazil) - 4:22
"Lay Down Your Burden" (Jesse Winchester) - 3:06
"Paper Friends" (Noel Brazil) - 4:00
"Poison Words" (Paul Doran) - 4:28

Personnel
Mary Black - vocals, harmony vocals
Declan Sinnott - acoustic guitar, electric guitar, Spanish guitar, lap steel guitar, mandola, synthesizer, harmony vocals
Garvan Gallagher - double bass, electric bass
Frank Gallagher - fiddle, synthesizer, whistle, string arrangement on "Poison Words"
Pat Crowley - keyboards, electric piano, piano, accordion, harmony vocals
Dave Early - drums, percussion, congas
Carl Geraghty - tenor and soprano saxophone
Mel Mercier - tabla on "Golden Thread"
Mairéad Ní Mhaonaigh - additional vocals on "The Holy Ground"
The Vanbrugh String Quartet - strings on "Poison Words"

References

External links

 Mary Black Album Page

1993 albums
Mary Black albums